Eddie Sharkey  (born February 4, 1936) is an American professional wrestling trainer. He is often called "The Trainer of Champions". He has been instrumental in training some of the biggest names in the sport. He was also the owner of Pro Wrestling America.

Professional wrestling career

American Wrestling Association
In the late 1950s, he joined the carnival circuit as a wrestler. Sharkey was trained by Boris Malenko, Bob Geigel, and Joe Scarpello. Sharkey made his American Wrestling Association (AWA) debut in Fargo, North Dakota in 1961 where he was a babyface. He had feuds with Danny Hodge, Bob Boyer, and Jack Donovan. Sharkey left the AWA over a disagreement with promoter Verne Gagne.

In September 1968, he won the NWA United States Heavyweight Championship from Jack Donovan in Central States Wrestling. The title was later retired.

Pro Wrestling America

While working at Gramma B's, Sharkey recognized the future that four of the bouncers (Hawk, Animal, Rick Rude, and Barry Darsow) could have in wrestling. Sharkey opened his own professional wrestling promotion, Pro Wrestling America, in 1982 and trained the men himself.

He also partnered with Terry Fox to open another professional wrestling school in Minnesota.

He defeated his student Lenny Lane for the FLWA South Haven Title in South Haven, Minnesota on July 24, 2004 at 68 years old.

Personal life
Growing up in south Minneapolis, Sharkey was a huge wrestling fan. His father, Tom Shyman, was a first-generation immigrant from Poland who worked in the liquor-display business. Sharkey took up boxing in his teens.

Sharkey married Maryland professional wrestler Princess Little Cloud (Dixie Jordan.) When Jordan gave birth to their children, he left the wrestling profession for eight years to spend more time at home. He took a job as a bartender at Gramma B's in the Twin Cities. Sharkey and Jordan later divorced. He married Mary Beth Rivera on April 20, 2006.

Wrestlers trained

Austin Aries
Bam Neely
Bob Backlund
Larry Cameron
Shawn Daivari
Barry Darsow 
Derrick Dukes
Paul Ellering
Mike Enos
Josie
Tommy Jammer
Nikita Koloff
Lacey
Lenny Lane
Valentin Bravo
John Nord
Johnny Love
Charlie Norris
ODB
Rain
Ricky Rice
Road Warrior Animal
Road Warrior Hawk
Rick Rude
Erick Rowan
Rick Steiner
Teijo Kahn
Jesse Ventura
Sean Waltman
The Warlord
Tom Zenk
Wayne Bloom
Jerry Lynn
Madusa

Championships and accomplishments
Cauliflower Alley Club
Art Abrams Lifetime Achievement Award (2006)
National Wrestling Alliance
NWA United States Heavyweight Championship (Central States version) (1 time)
FLWA
FLWA South Haven Title (1 time)

References

External links

American male professional wrestlers
1936 births
Living people
Sportspeople from Minneapolis
Professional wrestling trainers
Professional wrestling promoters
American people of Polish descent
Stampede Wrestling alumni
Sports coaches from Minneapolis